Pale sedge is a common name for several plants and may refer to:

Carex livida
Carex pallescens